Kananaskis Country is a multi-use area west of Calgary, Alberta, Canada in the foothills and front ranges of the Canadian Rockies. The area is named for the Kananaskis River, which was named by John Palliser in 1858 after a Cree acquaintance. Land uses include resource extraction activities (such as forestry, cattle grazing, water, oil and gas), recreation, power generation, and residential communities. Land designations include public land and protected areas.

Administration and purpose
The area, which now includes Kananaskis Country, has been administered since 1945 as Improvement District No. 5 (Kananaskis). It was established by the Municipal Affairs branch of the Alberta Government for multiple uses including logging, gas and oil extraction, cattle grazing, recreation and tourism. All activities are planned and facilities are developed with watershed protection as a priority.

Not all areas of Kananaskis Country are covered by the same measure of protection. Areas within Kananaskis Country include provincial parks, provincial recreation areas, wildland provincial parks, ecological reserves and Crown land. All of the aforementioned categories are governed by differing laws.

A management plan approved in March 2003 by the Kananaskis Country restricts further development in the Spray Valley Provincial Park area to preserve the ecological integrity. Restrictions were imposed on off-road vehicles, snowmobiles, horseback riding and biking, however a site in the Spray Valley is considered for the construction of a small lodge.

Kananaskis Country includes four areas of Crown land (also known as provincial land or public land) called Public Land Use Zones (PLUZ). The largest is the Kananaskis Country Public Land Use Zone which takes up over a quarter of Kananaskis Country's land area. The other public land uses zones are Sibbald, Cataract, and McLean. Land use zones do not include provincial parks or provincial recreation areas. Each Public Land Use Zone is managed differently, but permitted activities may include cattle grazing, trapping, mining, oil and gas exploration and production, logging, pipelines, cultivation, or commercial recreation operations. Recreational uses such as camping, mountain biking, hunting, hiking, horseback riding, and skiing are permitted with certain limitations. Motorized recreation is permitted in all zones except Kananaskis Country Public Land Use Zone.

In June 2021, the Alberta Government implemented user fees for all personal and commercial vehicles stopping in Kananaskis Country. The fees, known as a conservation pass, are meant to provide more conservation and safety measures, and improve services and facilities. The fee does not apply to the McLean Land Use Zone, which caters to motorized recreation.

Recreation and tourism 

Although Kananaskis Country is a multi-use area, it is noted for recreation and tourism. One of the reasons the area was established was to "alleviate congestion in national parks, and to provide greater recreation opportunities for Albertans". 

Recreation facilities in Kananaskis include several campgrounds, a golf course, a hotel, a holiday ranch, two alpine ski areas (Nakiska, which hosted alpine skiing and freestyle moguls skiing during the 1988 Winter Olympics and Fortress Mountain Resort and a competitive cross-country ski area, the Canmore Nordic Centre) that the public can use. The Canmore Nordic Centre was the venue for cross-country skiing events during the 1988 Winter Olympics. Most of the development is within Peter Lougheed Provincial Park and along the highway 40 corridor that parallels the Kananaskis River. Kananaskis has many kilometres of hiking, cross-country ski, and horse trails. Other activities popular in Kananaskis include mountain biking, scrambling, climbing, backpacking, hunting, and fishing.

Parks 

Several parks and campgrounds and one ecological reserve are located within Kananaskis. These include:

 Bluerock Wildland Provincial Park
 Bow Valley Provincial Park
 Bow Valley Wildland Provincial Park
 Bragg Creek Provincial Park
 Canmore Nordic Centre Provincial Park
 Don Getty Wildland Provincial Park
 Elbow-Sheep Wildland Provincial Park
 Peter Lougheed Provincial Park
 Plateau Mountain Ecological Reserve
 Sheep River Provincial Park
 Spray Valley Provincial Park

Special areas within Kananaskis Country that are not formally designated as parks or ecological reserves include the Bow Corridor Area, the Elbow River Valley Area, Evan-Thomas Provincial Recreation Area, the Highwood/Cataract Areas, Sentinel Provincial Recreation Area, Stoney Creek Provincial Recreation Area, Strawberry Provincial Recreation Area and the Sibbald Area (Sibbald Lake Provincial Recreation Area, Sibbald Meadows Pond Provincial Recreation Area).

Special facilities
A University of Calgary ecological and environmental research station is located nearby, at Barrier Lake. A "Tim Horton Children's Foundation" summer camp is also located in the area. Easter Seals Camp Horizon is located within Kananaskis along Highway 66. A YMCA summer camp, Camp Chief Hector, is located alongside the Trans-Canada Highway near exit 114. William Watson Lodge, a facility for people with disabilities, seniors, and their families is located in Peter Lougheed Provincial Park.

Access

Kananaskis Country can be accessed by five main highways that run into or through the area: Highway 40, a  segment of the Bighorn Highway and also known as Kananaskis Trail; Highway 66, a  highway originating near Bragg Creek known as Elbow Falls Trail; Highway 68, a  gravel highway originating from the Trans-Canada Highway (Highway 1) known as Sibbald Creek Trail; Highway 546, west of Turner Valley; and Highway 549 west of Millarville.

28th G8 Summit in Canada 

On June 26 and June 27, 2002, the area hosted the 28th G8 Summit. This annual "Group of 8" Summit was held in Kananaskis Village at the Kananaskis Resort (also called the "Delta Lodge at Kananaskis"). This was the second time Canada used a lodge venue for the G8 Summit, after its inaugural 7th G7 Summit at Montebello, Quebec in 1981. So far, it is the only G8 Summit to be held in western Canada. The 2002 conference pumped some $300-million into the Kananaskis and Alberta economy; however, security cost taxpayers in excess of $200-million.

Climate 
Kananaskis experiences a subarctic climate (Köppen climate classification Dfc).

Photo gallery

See also 
 The Canadian Rockies Trail Guide
 Scrambles in the Canadian Rockies
 List of Alberta provincial parks

References

External links 

Kananaskis Country
Kananaskis Improvement District

Canadian Rockies
 
Provincial parks of Alberta